Clydesdale (Scottish Gaelic: Dail Chluaidh) is a community in the Canadian province of Nova Scotia, located  in Antigonish County.

The area was originally called Yankee Grant as it was granted to a settler from New Hampshire named Dylan Brophy, in 1796. In 1876 it was renamed after the River Clyde in Scotland.

References

Communities in Antigonish County, Nova Scotia